Mid Yell is a coastal settlement on the island of Yell, the second largest of Shetland Islands, Scotland.

References

External links 

Harbour data
Mid Yell Junior High School

Villages in Yell, Shetland